Néstor Rolando Clausen (born 29 September 1962) is an Argentine football manager and former player who played as a defender.

A native of Arrufó, Santa Fe Province, his ancestors were originally from Ernen, Valais in Switzerland and emigrated to Argentina around the year 1889.

In his career, he played for Club Atlético Independiente, FC Sion, among others, and won the 1986 FIFA World Cup with Argentina.

Honours

Player

Club
Independiente
 Metropolitano 1983
 Copa Libertadores 1984
 Copa Intercontinental 1984
 Primera Division Argentina 1988–89
 Supercopa Sudamericana 1995

FC Sion
 Schweizer Cup 1990–91
 Swiss Super League 1991–92

International
Argentina
 FIFA World Cup: 1986

Manager
The Strongest
 Torneo Apertura 2003
 Torneo Clausura 2004

References

External links

Néstor Clausen at Footballdatabase
 Nestor Clausen Interview

1962 births
Living people
Argentine people of Swiss-German descent
People from San Cristóbal Department
Argentine footballers
Association football defenders

Club Atlético Independiente footballers
FC Sion players
Racing Club de Avellaneda footballers
Arsenal de Sarandí footballers

Argentine Primera División players
Swiss Super League players

Argentine expatriate footballers
Expatriate footballers in Switzerland
Argentine expatriate sportspeople in Switzerland

Argentina youth international footballers
Argentina under-20 international footballers
Argentina international footballers
1986 FIFA World Cup players
1983 Copa América players
1989 Copa América players
Copa Libertadores-winning players
FIFA World Cup-winning players

Argentine football managers
Club Atlético Independiente managers
Oriente Petrolero managers
The Strongest managers
Chacarita Juniors managers
FC Sion managers
Neuchâtel Xamax FCS managers
Kuwait SC managers
Club Bolívar managers
Dubai Club managers
Club Blooming managers
C.D. Jorge Wilstermann managers
Sport Boys Warnes managers
Bolivia national football team managers
Club San José managers
CS Sfaxien managers

Argentine expatriate football managers
Expatriate football managers in Switzerland
Argentine expatriate sportspeople in Oman
Expatriate football managers in Kuwait
Argentine expatriate sportspeople in Kuwait
Expatriate football managers in Bolivia
Argentine expatriate sportspeople in Bolivia
Expatriate football managers in the United Arab Emirates
Argentine expatriate sportspeople in the United Arab Emirates
Expatriate football managers in Peru
Argentine expatriate sportspeople in Peru
Expatriate football managers in Ecuador
Argentine expatriate sportspeople in Ecuador
Expatriate football managers in Tunisia
Argentine expatriate sportspeople in Tunisia

Kuwait Premier League managers
Bolivian Primera División managers
Tunisian Ligue Professionnelle 1 managers
Real Santa Cruz managers
Sportspeople from Santa Fe Province
Mushuc Runa S.C. managers